The Bernards Township School District is a comprehensive community public school district, serving students in pre-kindergarten through twelfth grade from Bernards Township in Somerset County, New Jersey, United States.

As of the 2020–21 school year, the district, comprised of six schools, had an enrollment of 4,874 students and 456.1 classroom teachers (on an FTE basis), for a student–teacher ratio of 10.7:1.

The district offers its Integrated Preschool Program for children on the autism spectrum, utilizing the principles of applied behavior analysis.

The district is classified by the New Jersey Department of Education as being in District Factor Group "J", the highest of eight groupings. District Factor Groups organize districts statewide to allow comparison by common socioeconomic characteristics of the local districts. From lowest socioeconomic status to highest, the categories are A, B, CD, DE, FG, GH, I and J.

Awards, recognition and rankings
During the 2009-10 school year, Ridge High School was awarded the Blue Ribbon School Award of Excellence by the United States Department of Education, the highest award an American school can receive. The school had also won the award for the 1986-87 school year. Mount Prospect Elementary School was one of 11 in the state to be recognized in 2014 by the United States Department of Education's National Blue Ribbon Schools Program. In 2015, Liberty Corner School was one of 15 schools in New Jersey, and one of nine public schools, recognized as a National Blue Ribbon School in the exemplary high performing category by the U.S. Department of Education.

Ridge High School was ranked 37th-best in America and second-best non-magnet high school by Newsweek in 2015, and ranked 71st overall in America (and third-highest ranked non-magnet school in New Jersey) by the magazine in 2016.

William Annin Middle School was chosen as a "School To Watch" in 2016, one of three middle schools in the state selected by the Schools To Watch Program.

Schools 
Schools in the district (with 2020–21 enrollment data from the National Center for Education Statistics) are:
Elementary schools
Cedar Hill Elementary School with 483 students in grades K-5
Paul Ciempola, Principal
Liberty Corner Elementary School with 466 students in grades K-5
James Oliver, Principal
Mount Prospect Elementary School with 507 students in grades PreK-5
Joanne Hozeny, Principal
Oak Street Elementary School with 406 students in grades K-5
Holly Foley, Principal
Middle school
William Annin Middle School with 1,201 students in grades 6-8. The school is one of the few in the United States to have a seismograph, which is part of the Lamont–Doherty Earth Observatory Cooperative Seismographic Network.
Karen Hudock, Principal
High school
Ridge High School with 1,794 students in grades 9-12
Russel Lazovick, Principal

Administration 
Core members of the district's administration are:
Nick Markarian, Superintendent
Rod McLaughlin, Business Administrator / Board Secretary

Board of education
The district's board of education is comprised of nine members who set policy and oversee the fiscal and educational operation of the district through its administration. As a Type II school district, the board's trustees are elected directly by voters to serve three-year terms of office on a staggered basis, with three seats up for election each year held (since 2012) as part of the November general election. The board appoints a superintendent to oversee the district's day-to-day operations and a business administrator to supervise the business functions of the district.

References

External links 
Bernards Township School District

School Data for the Bernards Township School District, National Center for Education Statistics

Bernards Township, New Jersey
New Jersey District Factor Group J
School districts in Somerset County, New Jersey